The volleyball tournaments, for the 2017 Bolivarian Games in Santa Marta, Colombia were held in the U-23 category between 12 and 23 November 2017 at Coliseo Municipal in Ciénaga, Magdalena.

Participating teams

Medal table
Key:

Medalists

References

Volleyball
Bolivarian Games
2017
2017 Bolivarian Games